Gonzalo Segundo Córdova y Rivera (15 July 1863 – 13 April 1928) was President of Ecuador from 1924–1925. Like his immediate predecessors in the Liberal Party, he was considered to be a pawn of "La Argolla" ("the ring"), a plutocracy of coastal agricultural and banking interests whose linchpin was the Commercial and Agricultural Bank of Guayaquil led by Francisco Urbina Jado.

Popular unrest, together with an ongoing economic crisis and a sickly president, laid the foundations for a bloodless coup d'état against Córdova in July 1925. Unlike previous coups in Ecuador, the 1925 coup was in the name of a collective grouping, the League of Young Officers, rather than a particular caudillo.

He was President of the Senate in 1918.

External links 

 Library of Congress country studies, Ecuador
 List of leaders of Ecuador at worldstatesmen.org

1863 births
1928 deaths
Presidents of Ecuador
Ecuadorian Radical Liberal Party politicians
Presidents of the Senate of Ecuador